Ken Quinnell (born 1939) is an Australia screenwriter and film director.

Journalism
Quinell has a background in publishing and  freelancejournalism, including working for Screen International and Rolling Stone. In the 1960s he was a member of the WEA Film Study Group, where he met writers Michael Thornhill  and  Frank Moorhouse.

From 1966 to 1968 Quinnell and Michael Thornhill published  SCJ: The Sydney Cinema Journal.

Film and television
Thornhill and Quinnell have worked in the Australian film industry.

Quinnell wrote the screenplays for Cathy's Child (1979) (with Dick Wordley) adapted from Wordley's novel Hoodwink (1981); and The City's Edge (1983), originally titled The Running Man. The City's Edge, which was made for television, was co-written by Robert J. Merritt and W.A. Harbison, adapted from W.A. Harbison's novel. Short Changed (1985) was also co-written by Merritt.

Awards
In 1981 Quinnell was nominated for the Australian Film Institute Award for Best Screenplay, Original or Adapted, for Hoodwink.

Bibliography

References

External links

Australian film directors
Australian screenwriters
1939 births
Living people